2,2′-Biquinoline is an organic compound with the formula (C9H6N)2.  It is one of several biquinolines.  It is prepared by reductive coupling of 2-chloroquinoline.  It is a colorimetric indicator for organolithium compounds.

Ligand properties

2,2′-Biquinoline is a bidentate ligand.  Unlike the related complexes of 2,2′-bipyridine, the metal does not typically occupy the plane of the biquinoline.

References

Quinolines